The Subprefecture of Itaim Paulista is one of 32 subprefectures of the city of São Paulo, Brazil.  It comprises two districts: Itaim Paulista and Vila Curuçá.

It's the easternmost subprefecture. Its population consists largely of migrants from the north-east of Brazil, in particular from the states of Bahia and Pernambuco.  Earlier immigrants came from Italy, Japan and Hungary.

References

Subprefectures of São Paulo